Iran's nuclear program is made up of a number of nuclear facilities, including nuclear reactors and various nuclear fuel cycle facilities.

Anarak
Anarak, near Yazd, has a nuclear waste storage site.

Arak

The Arak area has several industrial complexes, some with ties to the nuclear program, in particular the IR-40 reactor under construction and a heavy water production plant, both near Arak. In the late 1990s, one of these complexes may have manufactured a high-explosive test chamber transferred to Parchin, which the IAEA has asked to visit. The Arak area is also thought to hold factories capable of producing high-strength aluminum for IR-1 rotors.

Arak was one of the two sites exposed by a spokesman for the People's Mujahedin of Iran in 2002. In August 2006, Iran announced the inauguration of the Arak plant for the production of heavy water. Under the terms of Iran's safeguards agreement, Iran was under no obligation to report the existence of the site while it was still under construction since it was not within the 180-day time limit specified by the safeguards agreement. This reactor is intended to replace the life-expired 1967 Tehran Nuclear Research Center research reactor, mainly involved in the production of radioisotopes for medical and agricultural purposes.

Ardakan
The possible existence of a nuclear-related facility near Ardakan (also spelled Ardekan or Erdekan) was first reported on 8 July 2003, by the National Council of Resistance of Iran. Mohammad Ghannadi-Maragheh, Vice President for Nuclear Fuel Production of the Atomic Energy Organization of Iran (AEOI), said in September 2003 that the facility was a uranium mill with an annual capacity of 120,000 metric tonnes of ore and an annual output of 50 metric tons of uranium. Iran told the International Atomic Energy Agency (IAEA) that the facility would be hot tested July 2004, producing 40 to 50 kg of yellow cake, but as of 2008 Iran had provided no further information to the IAEA on its operation.

Bonab

The Atomic Energy Research Center at Bonab is investigating the applications of nuclear technology in agriculture. It is run by the AEOI.

Bushehr

Construction started in 1975 but was halted in July 1979 following the 1979 Iranian Revolution. The reactor was damaged by Iraqi air strikes during the Iran-Iraq war in the mid-1980s. Construction resumed in 1995, when Iran signed a contract with Russian company Atomstroyexport to install into the existing Bushehr I building a 915 MWe VVER-1000 pressurized water reactor. In December 2007 Russia started delivering nuclear fuel to the Bushehr nuclear power plant. The construction was completed in March 2009.

On 13 August 2010, Russia announced that fuel would be loaded into the plant beginning on 21 August, which would mark the beginning of the plant being considered a nuclear facility. Within six months after the fuel loading, the plant was planned to be fully operational.
Tehran and Moscow have established a joint venture to operate Bushehr because Iran has not yet had enough experience in maintaining such installations. However, Iran may begin almost all operational control of the reactor within two or three years.

On 23 September 2013, operational control of Bushehr was transferred to Iran. and in November 2014 Iran and Russia signed an agreement to build two new nuclear reactors at the Bushehr site, with an option of six more at other sites later. Construction formally started on 14 March 2017.

Chalus
In 1995, Iranian exiles living in Europe claimed Iran was building a secret facility for building nuclear weapons in a mountain 20 kilometres from the town of Chalus. In October 2003 Mohamed ElBaradei announced that "In terms of inspections, so far, we have been allowed to visit those sites to which we have requested access". It therefore appears the allegations about the Chalus site were unfounded.

Darkovin

Iran declared on 6 March 2007 that it has started construction of a domestically built nuclear power plant with capacity of 360 MW in Darkovin, in southwestern Iran.

Fordow

Fordow, near the city of Qom, is the site of an underground uranium enrichment facility at a former Islamic Revolutionary Guard Corps base. Existence of the then-unfinished Fordow Fuel Enrichment Plant (FFEP) was disclosed to the IAEA by Iran on 21 September 2009, but only after the site became known to Western intelligence services. Western officials strongly condemned Iran for not disclosing the site earlier; U.S. President Barack Obama said that Fordow had been under U.S. surveillance. In its initial declaration, Iran stated that the purpose of the facility was the production of UF6 enriched up to 5% U-235, and that the facility was being built to contain 16 cascades, with a total of approximately 3000 centrifuges. Iran argues that this disclosure was consistent with its legal obligations under its Safeguards Agreement with the IAEA, which Iran claims requires Iran to declare new facilities 180 days before they receive nuclear material. However, the IAEA stated that Iran was bound by its agreement in 2003 to declare the facility as soon as Iran decided to construct it. Later, in September 2011, Iran said it would move its production of 20% LEU to Fordow from Natanz, and enrichment started in December 2011. The Fordow plant was constructed at a depth of 80–90 m under the rocks. According to the Institute for Science and International Security, possible coordinates of the facility's location are: .

Isfahan
The Nuclear Technology Center of Isfahan is a nuclear research facility that currently operates four small nuclear research reactors, all supplied by China. It is run by the AEOI.

The Uranium Conversion Facility at Isfahan converts yellowcake into uranium hexafluoride. As of late October 2004, the site is 70% operational with 21 of 24 workshops completed. There is also a Zirconium Production Plant (ZPP) located nearby that produces the necessary ingredients and alloys for nuclear reactors.

As of 2022 another new nuclear construction development was built in suburban Isfahan .

Karaj
The Center for Agricultural Research and Nuclear Medicine at Hashtgerd was established in 1991 and is run by the AEOI.

Lashkar Abad
Lashkar Abad is a pilot plant for isotope separation. Established in 2002, the site was first exposed by Alireza Jafarzadeh in May 2003, which led to the inspection of the site by the IAEA. Laser enrichment experiments were carried out there, however, the plant has been shut down since Iran declared it has no intentions of enriching uranium using the laser isotope separation technique. In September 2006, Alireza Jafarzadeh claimed that the site has been revived by Iran and that laser enrichment has been taking place at this site.

Lavizan
() All buildings at the former Lavizan-Shian Technical Research Center site were demolished between August 2003 and March 2004. Environmental samples taken by IAEA inspectors showed no trace of radiation. The site is to be returned to the City of Tehran.

According to Reuters, claims by the US that topsoil has been removed and the site had been sanitized could not be verified by IAEA investigators who visited Lavizan:

Washington accused Iran of removing a substantial amount of topsoil and rubble from the site and replacing it with a new layer of soil, in what U.S. officials said might have been an attempt to cover clandestine nuclear activity at Lavizan.

Former U.S. ambassador to the IAEA, Kenneth Brill, accused Iran in June of using "the wrecking ball and bulldozer" to sanitize Lavizan prior to the arrival of U.N. inspectors.

But another diplomat close to the IAEA told Reuters that on-site inspections of Lavizan produced no proof that any soil had been removed at all.

Lavizan-3
On 24 January 2015, Iranian dissidents of the National Council of Resistance of Iran claimed a covert uranium enrichment facility, called Lavizan-3, existed just outside Tehran. The NCRI's claims were subsequently rejected by nuclear proliferation researchers such as Jeffrey Lewis based on further analysis of satellite imagery and the discovery that NCRI had portrayed a commercial company's reinforced door advertisement as part of the alleged nuclear facility. A report of the Federation of American Scientists portrayed the allegations as "debunked" in 2017. NCRI's allegations were made in the weeks before final agreements were reached between Iran and the USA over the JCPOA, which the group opposed.

Natanz
() Natanz is a hardened Fuel Enrichment Plant (FEP) covering 100,000 square meters that is built 8 meters underground and protected by a concrete wall 2.5 meters thick, itself protected by another concrete wall. It is located near Natanz, the capital city of Natanz County, Isfahan Province, Iran. In 2004, the roof was hardened with reinforced concrete and covered with 22 meters of earth. The complex consists of two 25,000 square meter halls and a number of administrative buildings. This once secret site was one of the two exposed by Alireza Jafarzadeh in August, 2002. IAEA Director General Mohamed ElBaradei visited the site on 21 February 2003 and reported that 160 centrifuges were complete and ready for operation, with 1,000 more under construction at the site. In accordance with Code 3.1 of the Subsidiary Arrangements to Iran's safeguards agreement that were in force up to that time, Iran was not obligated to declare the Natanz enrichment facility until six months before nuclear material was introduced into the facility. According to the IAEA, in 2009 there were approximately 7,000 centrifuges installed at Natanz, of which 5,000 were producing low enriched uranium.

In July 2020, the Atomic Energy Organization of Iran released photos of a building, presumed to be a centrifuge assembly facility, after a recent explosion. An unnamed Middle Eastern intelligence official later claimed that damage to the facility was caused by an explosive device.

On 28 October 2020, the Center for Nonproliferation Studies released satellite images acknowledging that Iran had begun the construction of an underground plant near its nuclear facility at Natanz. In March 2021, Iran restarted enriching uranium at the Natanz facility with a third set of advanced nuclear centrifuges in a series of violations of the 2015 nuclear accord. On 10 April, Iran began injecting uranium hexaflouride gas into advanced IR-6 and IR- 5 centrifuges at Natanz, but on the next day, an accident occurred in the electricity distribution network. On 11 April, IRNA reported that the incident was due to a power failure and that there were no injuries nor any escape of radioactive material. Further details eventually emerged that it was actually Israel that orchestrated the attack. On 17 April, Iranian state television named 43-year-old Reza Karimi from Kashan as a suspect for the blackout, stating that he had fled the country before the sabotage happened. In July 2021, Iran reportedly limited inspectors' access to the plant.

Parchin
Parchin Military Complex is located approximately 20 kilometers southeast of downtown Tehran. The IAEA was given access to Parchin on 1 November 2005, and took environmental samples: inspectors did not observe any unusual activities in the buildings visited, and the results of the analysis of environmental samples did not indicate the presence of nuclear material. Parchin is a facility for the testing and manufacturing of conventional explosives; IAEA safeguards inspectors were looking not for evidence of nuclear material, but of the kind of explosives testing consistent with nuclear weapons research and development. In November 2011, the IAEA reported that it had "credible" information that Parchin was used for implosion testing. The IAEA sought additional access to Parchin, which Iran did not grant.

Saghand
Saghand is Iran's first uranium ore mine that became operational in March 2005. The deposit is estimated to contain 3,000 to 5,000 tons of uranium oxide at a density of about 500 ppm over an area of 100 to 150 square kilometers.

Tehran Research Reactor
The Tehran Research Reactor (TRR) was supplied by the United States under the Atoms for Peace program. The 5-megawatt pool-type nuclear research reactor became operational in 1967 and initially used highly enriched uranium fuel. Light water is used as moderator, coolant and shielding. The TRR core lattice is a 9×6 array containing Standard Fuel Elements (SFEs), Control Fuel Elements (CFEs), irradiation boxes (as vertical tubes provided within the core lattice configuration for long term irradiation of samples and radioisotope production) and graphite boxes (as reflectors).

After the Iranian Revolution, the United States cut off the supply of highly enriched uranium (HEU) fuel for the TRR, which forced the reactor to be shut down for a number of years. Due to the nuclear proliferation concerns caused by the use of HEUs and following Reduced Enrichment Research and Test Reactor (RERTR) Programs, Iran signed agreements with Argentina's National Atomic Energy Commission to convert the TRR from highly enriched uranium fuel to low-enriched uranium, and to supply the low-enriched uranium to Iran in 1987–88. TRR core was converted to use Low Enriched Uranium (LEU) fuels in 1993. Fuel elements of TRR are now plate-type U3O8-Al with approximately 20% enrichment. In February 2012, Iran loaded the first domestically produced fuel element into the Tehran Research Reactor.

Standard fuel elements of TRR have 19 fuel plates, while CFEs have only 14 fuel plates to accommodate the fork-type control rods. Control of the reactor is accomplished by the insertion or removal of safety and regulating absorber plates, which contain Ag–In–Cd alloy and stainless steel, respectively. The negative temperature coefficient of reactivity of the system provides additional passive nuclear safety.

The reactor core is immersed in either section of a two-section, concrete pool filled with water. One of the sections of the pool contains an experimental stall into which beam tubes and other experimental facilities converge. The other section is an open area for bulk irradiation studies. The reactor can be operated in either section.

The reactor experimental facilities in the stall end are as follow:

Two pneumatic rabbit tubes (for short term irradiation of samples)
One graphite thermal column
One 12"×12" beam tube
Four 6" diameter beam tubes
One 8" diameter beam tube
One 6" diameter through tube

TRR core cooling is accomplished by gravity flow of pool water at nominal rate of 500 m3/hr through the reactor core, grid plate, plenum and into the hold-up tank from where it is pumped through the shell of the heat exchanger and then back into the pool.

TRR offers a variety of education and exposure services and production of radioisotopes for medical, scientific and industrial centers. One of the primary objectives of the facility is to render services to scientists, engineers and graduate students in nuclear techniques. Tehran research reactor can be utilized for laboratory work involving studies of the reactor core and experiments on neutron diffusion, neutron diffraction, shielding, gamma spectroscopy, boron neutron capture therapy, neutron radiography and neutron activation analysis.

Yazd
Yazd Radiation Processing Center, established in 1998 by AEOI, is equipped with a Rhodotron TT200 accelerator, made by IBA, Belgium, with outputs of 5 and 10MeV beam lines and a maximum power of 100 kW.  the centre is engaged in geophysical research to analyze the mineral deposits surrounding the city and was expected to play an important role in supporting the medical and polymer industries.

In 2016, an AEOI spokesman stated that AEOI plans to build at least 10 multipurpose gamma irradiation plants for radiation sterilization of disposable medical products, and that Iran needs 5 electron beam accelerators for wastewater treatment and 10 for material modification.

References

External links

 The first-ever English-language website about Iran's nuclear energy program
 Iran's key nuclear sites by BBC news
 Iran nuclear sites ISIS
Videos
Fordow Fuel Enrichment Plant - Nuclear Threat Initiative (2015)
Natanz Enrichment Complex - Nuclear Threat Initiative (2015)
IRANIAN centrifuges IR-1, IR-2M, and IR-4 - Nuclear Threat Initiative (2015)

Nuclear program of Iran
Iran
Nuclear energy in Iran

he:תוכנית הגרעין האיראנית#מתקני גרעין